Deva Premal (born 2 April 1970 in Nürnberg, Germany, as Jolantha Fries) is a singer known for introducing Sanskrit mantras into the mainstream. Her meditative, spiritual music — composed and produced with Prabhu Music — places ancient Tibetan and Sanskrit mantras into contemporary settings. Her album Deva (2018) received a Grammy Award nomination for Best New Age Album for the 62nd Annual Grammy Awards.

Biography 

Premal met her partner in life and music, Miten, at the Osho International Meditation Resort in Pune, India in 1990, where she was studying reflexology, shiatsu, cranio-sacral therapy, and massage. They have been touring together since 1992, offering concerts and chant workshops worldwide.

Best known for her top-selling chant CDs, Premal is a classically trained musician who grew up singing mantras in a German home permeated with Eastern spirituality. Her albums have topped New Age charts throughout the world since her first release, The Essence (1998), which features the "Gayatri Mantra." Premal and Miten's record company, Prabhu Music, reports sales of over 900,000 albums.

Premal says she began her journey with mantra in her mother's womb, as her father chanted the "Gayatri Mantra" daily—one of the most sacred mantras of Sanatana Dharma.  The mantra continued to be her bedtime lullaby after she was born. Many years later, she heard a friend singing the Gayatri and was inspired to put together an album. Premal and Miten recorded The Essence (1998) in her mother's apartment in Germany, where she was born and where she first heard the Gayatri Mantra.

Premal brought this journey with the Gayatri Mantra full circle in July 2005, when she and Miten chanted it for her father as he was dying; "We kept singing for what must have been over half an hour, when suddenly the monitor showed that he was about to leave. I continued to sing, and the last sound he heard as he passed on was his beloved "Gayatri Mantra." Finally we ended with the mantra Om and the circle was complete. He had welcomed me onto this planet with the "Gayatri," and I accompanied him out of this physical existence with it. What a blessing this was for me! It was the first time that I was present at a death, and to be at my father's is a memory I will cherish all my life."

In an interview with Sam Slovik of LA Yoga Magazine, Premal discussed the potent effect many notice when chanting mantras:

“The meaning is secondary. The word table is not the table...with Sanskrit, the word ananda is the sound vibration of bliss. In sound the energy of bliss. We have to say bliss; we have to make it smaller by putting it into an English word. Just the sound; ananda, If we were sensitive enough, we'd just feel the entire scope of that energy that's contained in this sound... It's working on a cellular level. It's much deeper than the mind. It's not a language that you need to understand the meaning of before you use it. It's a deep universal sound code that connects us all.”

Premal's chants have been used in a variety of settings. Cher featured Premal's version of the "Gayatri Mantra" on her Farewell Tour and Russian prima ballerina Diana Vishneva danced to Premal's "Gayatri" in Moses Pendleton's F.L.O.W. series. Actor/director Edward James Olmos is said to have handed out copies of Premal's "Gayatri Mantra" to the cast and crew of Battlestar Galactica, as well as citing her music as an inspiration in preparing his role as Commander Adama in the series. Olmos also used "Om Hraum Mitraya" from Premal's album Dakshina (2005) to close his HBO movie Walkout,

Premal and Miten performed for The Dalai Lama during a 2002 Conference in Munich, Germany on "Unity in Duality," which brought top figures from the scientific community together with members of the Buddhist community. They gave a concert for the full conference, and were also invited to sing for the Dalai Lama at a small pre-conference gathering. They had heard that the Dalai Lama's favorite mantra was the Tara Mantra, dedicated to the Green Tara of Compassion, and that he had asked for it be chanted recently when he was ill, so they chanted it for him.

Premal's Tibetan Mantras for Precarious Times (2010) was recorded with the Gyuto Monks of Tibet, known for their tradition of overtone singing, also described as "chordal chanting". It was created as a support for mantra meditation practice, featuring eight mantras chanted 108 times each. It is a benefit CD, with proceeds going to the Gyuto Monastery in Dharmsala, India, the Phowa Project, and Veggiyana.

Music & information 

Premal and Miten say they use a process of "natural selection" to choose the mantras on their albums.  Premal has said she gravitates toward Sanskrit mantras, rather than mantras from other languages.  She says that, for her, removing her ego from her understanding of the mantra allows the creative process to express the true meaning of the mantra.

She explains that the purpose of their work "is to be open to the Goddess of music – to be true to ourselves, as musicians, as 'teachers;' as partners, and ultimately, as individuals – fellow travellers.  We accomplish this by not 'trying' to accomplish anything. We take very little credit for what is happening around our so-called success (we have sold over a million albums now) – we see ourselves as messengers of a 5,000-year-old tradition...so, our part in the process is simply to show up and chant."
Her vocal range is contralto.

Discography 
 1997 – Trusting the Silence (with Miten)
 1998 – The Essence
 1998 – Strength of a Rose (with Miten)
 2000 – Love Is Space
 2002 – Embrace
 2002 – Satsang (with Miten)
 2003 – Songs for the Inner Lover (with Miten)
 2004 – More Than Music (with Miten)
 2005 – Dakshina
 2005 – Live in Byron Bay (with Miten)
 2007 – Sings the Moola Mantra
 2007 – Soul in Wonder (with Miten and Manose)
 2008 – Into Silence
 2009 – In Concert – The Yoga of Sacred Song and Chant (with Miten and Manose)
 2009 – Mantras for Precarious Times
 2009 – DevaSonic Vol 1
 2009 – DevaSonic Vol 2
 2009 – Download Singles (with Miten)
 2010 – Into Light
 2010 – Tibetan Mantras for Turbulent Times
 2011 – Password
 2013 – 21-Day Mantra Meditation Journey (with Miten)
 2013 – A Deeper Light (with Miten and Manose)
 2013 – MantraLove (with Miten)
 2014 – Mantras for Life (with Miten and Manose)
 2014 – The Spirit of Mantra (21-Day Mantra Meditation Journey, Vol. II) (with Miten)
 2015 – Songs for the Sangha (with Miten and Manose)
 2016 – Cosmic Connections Live (with Miten and Manose)
 2018 – Deva

Notes

External links
 

New-age musicians
Performers of Hindu music
Living people
1970 births
Musicians from Nuremberg
Performers of Buddhist music
21st-century German women singers